Thil Island is a small rocky island lying 1 nautical mile (1.9 km) northeast of Jennings Promontory in the eastern part of the Amery Ice Shelf. Delineated in 1952 by John H. Roscoe from air photos taken by U.S. Navy Operation Highjump, 1946–47. Named by Roscoe for R.B. Thil, air crewman on Operation Highjump photographic flights over this area.

See also 
 List of antarctic and sub-antarctic islands

Islands of Princess Elizabeth Land